Zhumadian (postal: Chumatien) is a prefecture-level city in southern Henan province, China. It borders Xinyang to the south, Nanyang to the west, Pingdingshan to the northwest, Luohe to the north, Zhoukou to the northeast, and the province of Anhui to the east.

As of the 2020 Chinese census, its total population was 7,008,427 inhabitants whom 1,466,913 lived in the built-up (or metro) area made of Yicheng District and Suiping County now conurbated.

It was once the center of the Cai state during the Eastern Zhou era. The state leaves its name in several of the subdivisions including Shangcai County and Xincai County.

Administrative divisions 
The prefecture-level city of Zhumadian administers 1 district and 9 counties.

Yicheng District
Runan County
Pingyu County
Xincai County
Shangcai County
Xiping County
Suiping County
Queshan County
Zhengyang County
Biyang County

Geography 
Neighbouring prefectures are:

Fuyang, Anhui (E)
Xinyang (S)
Nanyang (W)
Pingdingshan (NW)
Luohe (N)
Zhoukou (NE)

The terrain is dominated by mountains, hills, hillocks, and plains.

Climate 
Zhumadian has a four-season, monsoon-influenced humid subtropical climate (Köppen Cwa), with cold, somewhat damp, winters, and hot, humid summers. More than 60% of the annual precipitation of  occurs from June to September. With monthly percent possible sunshine ranging from 39% in March to 46% in four months, the city receives 1,927 hours of bright sunshine annually.

Agriculture 
Mainly wheat, maize, peanut, sesame, green beans and tobacco.

Culture 
Zhumadian has a rich cultural history and the birthplace of many great people in ancient times . There is an old site of Liang Shanbo and Zhu Yingtai who are the characters in the Butterfly Lovers, a famous Chinese story.

Zhumadian is the location of Mount Chaya, a major geological site of interest and tourist attraction.

Dams 
Zhumadian has 62 different dams including Banqiao Dam within its territory. The failure of the Banqiao and Shimantan Dams in 1975, which caused more than 150,000 casualties and made more than 10 million people  homeless, is considered the biggest catastrophe of its kind.

Transportation 
One of the Chinese main highways, China National Highway 107, runs through Zhumadian. Zhumadian also has its own transportation system.

References

External links 
Government website of Zhumadian (in Simplified Chinese)

Cities in Henan
Prefecture-level divisions of Henan